Cyrille Thièry (born 27 September 1990) is a Swiss professional racing cyclist, who currently rides for UCI Continental team . He rode at the 2015 UCI Track Cycling World Championships.

Major results

Road

2008
 1st  Overall Grand Prix Rüebliland
1st  Mountains classification
1st  Points classification
1st Stages 1 & 4
 2nd Trofeo Emilio Paganessi
 4th Overall Tour du Pays de Vaud
 4th Overall Driedaagse van Axel
2016
 3rd Overall International Tour of Rhodes
 5th Overall Tour de Hokkaido
2018
 2nd Overall Rás Tailteann
1st Stage 1
 7th Flèche Ardennaise
2019
 8th Overall New Zealand Cycle Classic
1st  Mountains classification
 10th Grote Prijs Stad Zottegem
2021
 4th Road race, National Road Championships

Track

2008
 2nd Team pursuit, National Track Championships
2009
 National Track Championships
2nd Team pursuit
3rd Points race
2010
 3rd Team pursuit, National Track Championships
2011
 National Track Championships
1st  Team pursuit
2nd Madison
3rd Points race
3rd Scratch
 UEC European Under-23 Championships
1st  Madison (with Silvan Dillier)
3rd  Team pursuit
 2nd  Madison, UEC European Championships
 3rd Madison, UCI World Cup, Cali
2012
 National Track Championships
1st  Madison (with Théry Schir)
2nd Team pursuit
3rd Scratch
3rd Team sprint
 2nd  Team pursuit, UEC European Under-23 Championships
2013
 2nd Madison, National Track Championships
2014
 National Track Championships
1st  Team pursuit
2nd Madison
3rd Points race
 2nd Team pursuit, 2013–14 UCI Track Cycling World Cup, Guadalajara
2015
 2nd Omnium, National Track Championships
2016
 National Track Championships
2nd Individual pursuit
3rd Madison
3rd Points race
2017
 National Track Championships
1st  Individual pursuit
2nd Madison
3rd Points race
2018
 2nd  Team pursuit, UEC European Championships
 3rd Team pursuit, 2018–19 UCI Track Cycling World Cup, Cambridge
 3rd Omnium, National Track Championships
2019
 National Track Championships
1st  Individual pursuit
3rd Madison
 3rd Team pursuit, 2019–20 UCI Track Cycling World Cup, Hong Kong

References

External links

1990 births
Living people
Swiss male cyclists
Sportspeople from Lausanne
Olympic cyclists of Switzerland
Cyclists at the 2016 Summer Olympics
Cyclists at the 2020 Summer Olympics
Swiss track cyclists